Buchholz (Aller) is a municipality in the Heidekreis district, in Lower Saxony, Germany.

References

Heidekreis